This article serves as an index - as complete as possible - of all the honorific orders or similar decorations received by the governors of Penang, classified by continent, awarding country and recipient.

Various honours and titles have been received from time to time by the Governor of Penang, one of the thirteen states of Malaysia. The governor bears the title of Yang di-Pertua Negeri, and is appointed by the Malaysian head of state (Yang di-Pertuan Agong).

State of Penang 

 Raja Uda Raja Muhammad (1st Governor of Penang :  - ) :
  Founding Grand Master and Knight Grand Commander of the Order of the Defender of State
 Syed Sheh Shahabudin (2nd Governor of Penang :  - ) :
  Grand Master of the Order of the Defender of State
 Syed Sheh Hassan Barakbah (3rd Governor of Penang :  - ) :
  Grand Master of the Order of the Defender of State
 Sardon Haji Jubir (4th Governor of Penang :  - ) :
  Grand Master of the Order of the Defender of State
 Awang bin Hassan (5th Governor of Penang :  - ) :
  Grand Master of the Order of the Defender of State
 Hamdan Sheikh Tahir (6th Governor of Penang :  - ) : 
  Grand Master of the Order of the Defender of State
 Abdul Rahman Abbas (7th Governor of Penang :  - present) :
 Order of the Defender of State :
  Member (DJN)
  Companion (DMPN) with title Dato’
  Knight Grand Commander (DUPN) with title Dato’ Seri Utama
  Grand Master
 Majimor Binti Sharif, his wife :
  Knight Grand Commander of the Order of the Defender of State (DUPN)

Malaysia, sultanates and states

Malaysia 

 Raja Uda Raja Muhammad (1st Governor of Penang :  - ) : 
  Grand Commander of the Order of the Defender of the Realm (SMN) with title Tun
 Abdul Rahman Abbas (7th Governor of Penang :  - present) :
  Grand Commander of the Order of the Defender of the Realm (SMN) with title Tun

Sultanate of Kedah 

 Abdul Rahman Abbas (Governor of Penang :  - present) : 
  Member of the Supreme Order of Sri Mahawangsa (DMK)

State of Sabah 

 Abdul Rahman Abbas (Governor of Penang :  - present) : 
  Grand Commander of the Order of Kinabalu (SPDK) with title Datuk Seri Panglima

State of Sarawak 

 Abdul Rahman Abbas (Governor of Penang :  - present) : 
  Knight Grand Commander (Datuk Patinggi) of the Order of the Star of Hornbill Sarawak (DP) with title  	Datuk Patinggi

Asian honours

Far East  

To be completed if any ...

Middle East   

To be completed if any ...

American  honours 

To be completed if any ...

European honours

United Kingdom 

 Raja Uda Raja Muhammad (1st Governor of Penang :  - ) :  
 (now Honorary) Knight Commander of the Most Excellent Order of the British Empire (KBE, 1.6.1953) with title Sir ( before the independence at least )
 (now Honorary) Companion of the Order of St Michael and St George (CMG, 1.1.1951)

To be completed if any other ...

African honours 

To be completed if any ...

References

Notes 

 
Penang